Summit Publishing Co., Inc., trading as Summit Media, is a Filipino digital lifestyle network in the Philippines. It has 15 media brands attracting around 20 million monthly unique visitors and approximately 33 million social media followers. It began as a consumer magazine publisher in June 1995, with Preview as its first magazine title. It turned into a publication conglomerate which published several lifestyle magazines titles, including Candy for young Filipino girls and Yes!, a Philippine entertainment magazine. 

The company is privately owned by Lisa Gokongwei-Cheng, the daughter of Filipino businessman John Gokongwei. It has expanded to publishing specialized magazines for companies and occasions in the Philippines, and also started publishing short books designed for Filipino readers.

The results of the 2014 TNS Newsstand Survey showed that Summit Media had popularity in 12 categories: young women (Cosmopolitan Philippines - 60%), fashion (Preview - 38%), celebrity (YES! - 55%),  men's luxury (Esquire Philippines - 93%), men's lifestyle (FHM Philippines - 71%), home (Real Living Philippines - 42%), family and home (Good Housekeeping Philippines - 47%), teens (Candy - 63%), parenting (Smart Parenting - 34%), automotive (Top Gear Philippines - 69%), society (Town & Country Philippines - 31%), and food (Yummy - 51%). The company also had the largest score in the local book publishing measurement with seven out of 10 books sold.

Its different magazine titles are printed to copies that run over 100,000. It has been cited in Philippine Business magazine and Eventsite.

On April 11, 2018, Summit Media announced the impending closure of the last six printed magazines namely, Cosmopolitan, FHM, Preview, Top Gear, Town and Country (all relegated to their online portals) and Yes! (relegated to Philippine Entertainment Portal), as part of the fully completed digitalization of the company, marking the end of the 23-year run of printing industry.

List of magazines published

Current 
Last printed titles published by Summit Media include:
Preview - A local fashion magazine that was launched in 1995. It was the very first magazine of Summit, leading to its establishment.
Cosmopolitan Philippines - A female fashion magazine that was launched in 1997. Licensed from Hearst Corporation. 
Esquire Philippines - A male fashion magazine that was launched in 2011. Licensed from Hearst Corporation. 
YES! - A local showbiz-oriented magazine that was launched in 2000.
Top Gear Philippines - A number # 1 car magazine for all car and all other auto enthusiasts that was launched in 2004. Licensed from BBC Worldwide and Immediate Media Company. 
Sparkling - A K-Pop entertainment and lifestyle magazine that was launched in 2010.

Former
Some of the magazine titles are ceased in publication, here are the following:
GamesMaster Philippines (August 2003–September 2006) (licensed from Future plc)
Hi! (October 2004–March 2008)
W.I.T.C.H. (July 2002–August 2008, ended on the sixth saga after being the last to be translated into English)
T3 Philippines (January 2004–April 2009) (licensed from Future plc)
Marie Claire Philippines (November 2005–April 2009) (licensed from Groupe Marie Claire)
Martha Stewart Weddings Philippines (September 2008–August 2012) (licensed from Martha Stewart Living Omnimedia)
OK! Philippines (April 2005–December 2012) (licensed from Northern & Shell)
Good Dog (April 2011–October 2013)
Seventeen Philippines  (July 2000-April 2009) (licensed from Hearst Corporation)
Women's Health Philippines (April 2009–November 2014) (licensed from Rodale Inc./Hearst)
Runner's World Philippines (April 2010–December 2014) (licensed from Rodale Inc./Hearst)
ELLE Decor Philippines (October 2012–November 2015)
Men's Health Philippines (May 2005-December 2015) (licensed from Rodale Inc./Hearst)
Entrepreneur Philippines (November 2000-January 2016) (licensed from Entrepreneur Media)
Total Girl Philippines (September 2004–April 2016) (licensed from Pacific Magazines/nextmedia)
K-Zone Philippines (October 2002–July 2017) (licensed from Pacific Magazines/nextmedia)
Good Housekeeping Philippines (May 1998–August 2017) (licensed from Hearst Corporation)
Disney Princess (November 2003-April 2017) (licensed from Disney Publishing Worldwide and Egmont Group)
Prevention Philippines (2000-2003) (licensed from Rodale, Inc./Hearst)
FHM (For Him Magazine) Philippines (March 2000–May 2018) (licensed from Bauer Media Group)
Town & Country Philippines (September 2007–May 2018) (licensed from Hearst Corporation)

List of internet properties
Summit Media operates web-exclusive sites of its published magazines. Philippine Entertainment Portal, Inc., a joint venture with GMA New Media, Inc., operates Philippine Entertainment Portal (PEP.ph) and Sports Interactive Network Philippines (SPIN.ph). Summit Media also operates verticals such as Jobstreet.com.ph, MyProperty.com.ph and TravelBook.ph

Current
CandyMag.com
Cosmo.ph
EsquireMag.ph
FemaleNetwork.com
PEP.ph (Philippine Entertainment Portal)
Preview.ph
RealLiving.com.ph
reportr.world (moved to spot.ph)
SmartParenting.com.ph
Spot.ph
SPIN.ph (Sports Interactive Network)
TopBikes.ph
TopGear.com.ph (Top Gear Philippines Online)
Yummy.ph

Partnerships
 ABS-CBN Film Productions Inc.
 Are Media
 BBC Worldwide
 Bauer Media Group
 Blackpencil Manila
 Disney Publishing Worldwide
 Egmont Group
 Entrepreneur Media
 Forbes Inc.
 Future plc
 GMA New Media
 Hearst Communications
 Immediate Media Company 
 Lagardère Active
 Meredith Corporation
 Nextmedia
 Northern & Shell
 Pacific Magazines
 Recruit Japan
 Ringier
 Rodale, Inc.
 TV5 Network Inc.
 WP Technology Inc.

References

External links
 

Consumer magazines
Magazines published in the Philippines
Magazine publishing companies
Publishing companies of the Philippines
Publishing companies established in 1995
Magazines established in 1995
Companies based in Mandaluyong
1995 establishments in the Philippines